Judith Davidson Chafee (1932–1998) was an American architect known for her work on residential buildings in Arizona and for being a professor of architecture at the University of Arizona.  She was a recipient of the National Endowment of the Arts Fellowship to the American Academy in Rome during the middle of her career and was the first woman from Arizona to be named a Fellow of the American Institute of Architects.

Biography
Chafee was born in Chicago in 1932.  Her mother, Christina Chafee, had studied archaeology and anthropology.  Chafee's biological father died before she was born, but had maintained investments for his family.  The family moved to Tucson, Arizona when Chafee was five years old, shortly after her mother remarried.

Chafee attended a boarding school in Chicago in the late 1940s, earned a visual arts degree at Bennington College in 1954, and enrolled in the School of Architecture at Yale University under the deanship of Paul Rudolph. While a student at Yale, Chafee won a competition for the design of a hospital, however the award ceremony was held in a men's club and she had to go through the kitchen to receive the plaque. Chafee graduated from Yale as the only woman in her class and went on to work for Eero Saarinen, Paul Rudolph, Edward Larrabee Barnes, and The Architects Collaborative (Walter Gropius). At the age of 38 Chafee returned to her native Tucson, Arizona to start her own architectural practice.

Chafee worked out of her Tucson office for the remainder of her career, producing mostly single family residences. Her projects are highly regarded and she became the first woman in Arizona to be named an AIA Fellow. Among other awards, Chafee was awarded the Academy of Rome fellowship to study architecture in Italy. She taught for many years at the University of Arizona, was a visiting professor at the University of Texas and the School of Architecture at Washington University in St. Louis, and led a studio at the Massachusetts Institute of Technology. 
The Judith Chafee papers are held at the University of Arizona Special Collections library.

Major works

Chafee's architectural work is predominantly located in Arizona. Significant examples of her work that have been listed on the National Register of Historic Places included Viewpoint (1974), Ramada House (1975) and the Jacobson House (1977)  These houses have been widely and internationally published. Ramada House structure has both private rooms and public areas, and features a large shade structure constructed of rounded lengths of wood and two-by-fours. Other prominent designs include:

 Ruth Merrill House, (1969), 51 Andrews Road, Guilford, CT 
 Robert Funking House, (1970), 421 Furnace Road, Richmond, MA 
 Judith Chafee Studio and Residence, (1971) Adobe Reconstruction, 317 North Court Avenue, Tucson, AZ, NRHP-listed   
 Viewpoint, Christina Davidson Bloom Johnson House, (1974), 2840 North Sunrock Lane, Tucson, AZ, NRHP-listed 
 Ramada House, Jane Solomon House, (1975), 2801 East Camino Norberto, Tucson, AZ, NRHP-listed
Jacobson House (1977), 5645 North Campbell Avenue, Tucson, AZ, NRHP-listed
 Jerry Blackwell House (1979), Tucson, AZ, (Demolished by Pima County) 
 Hydeman House, (1982), 85 Hog Canyon Road, Patagonia, AZ
 Centrum House, (1984), 6606 Circulo Otono, Tucson AZ.
 Finkel House (1984), 6655 East Placita Alhaja, Tucson, AZ
 Rieveschel House (1988), 7046 North Javelina Drive, Tucson, Arizona

External Links 

 Freeman, Allen. 1984. “Reinterpreting Regionalism: Arizona: Three Architects Who Respect the Desert Terrain and Traditions.” Architecture: The AIA Journal 73 (3). 
 Gordon, Barclay F.1975. “Record Houses of 1975.” Architectural Record 157, no. 6 (May 1, 1975): 83-84. 
 Nairn, Janet. 1979. “A Desert House Revives Its Region’s Traditional Forms: Private Residence, Southern Arizona; Architect: Judith Chafee.” Architectural Record 165 (2): 107–110.

References

American women architects
20th-century American architects
1932 births
1988 deaths
Architects from Chicago
Bennington College alumni
Yale School of Architecture alumni
University of Arizona faculty
20th-century American women
American women academics
Washington University in St. Louis faculty
University of Texas faculty